The 1997 Hawaii Rainbow Warriors football team represented the University of Hawaiʻi at Mānoa in the Western Athletic Conference during the 1997 NCAA Division I-A football season. In their second season under head coach Fred von Appen, the Rainbow Warriors compiled a 3–9 record.

Schedule

References

Hawaii
Hawaii Rainbow Warriors football seasons
Hawaii Rainbow Warriors football